George Marcus Burley (born 23 December 1900) was an English professional footballer who played predominantly as a centre forward.

Born in West Ham, he started his career with Ellesmere Port and later played for Chester. In October 1926, Burley was signed by Football League First Division side Burnley. He made his debut for the club in the goalless draw with Bury on 6 November 1926. Burley made only one more appearance during the 1926–27, deputising for Joe Devine in the 0–2 defeat away at Huddersfield Town on 12 March 1927. He again made just two league appearances in the following campaign. Burley played his last competitive match for Burnley on 8 February 1928 in the 1–3 loss to Aston Villa, a game which saw Archie Heslop and Joe Mantle make their debuts for the club.

Burley remained at Turf Moor until July 1929, when he left to sign for Colwyn Bay. He later played for Stalybridge Celtic and had a second spell at Chester.

References

1900 births
Year of death missing
Footballers from West Ham
English footballers
Association football forwards
Chester City F.C. players
Ellesmere Port Town F.C. players
Burnley F.C. players
Colwyn Bay F.C. players
Stalybridge Celtic F.C. players
English Football League players